María Pérez García may refer to:

María Paulina Pérez (born 1996), Colombian tennis player
María Pérez (racewalker) (born 1996), Spanish racewalker